Dol pri Vogljah is a settlement in the Municipality of Sežana in the Littoral region of Slovenia on the border with Italy.

References

External links

Dol pri Vogljah on Geopedia

Populated places in the Municipality of Sežana